is a grouping of historic sites concentrated in and around the Japanese city of Kamakura, near Tokyo. The city gave its name to the Kamakura shogunate which governed the country during the Kamakura period (1185-1333). In 1992 the monuments were submitted jointly for inscription on the UNESCO World Heritage List under criteria i, ii, iii, iv, and vi.

In January 2012 it was announced that the Japanese government would formally submit the Kamakura site, along with Mount Fuji, for consideration by the World Heritage Committee in 2013. ICOMOS, the advisory body for cultural World Heritage Sites, inspected the site in late 2012. The request was considered by the World Heritage Committee at its 37th session in Phnom Penh, Cambodia in September, 2013. ICOMOS recommended not inscribing the site on the List, stating that the historical aspects of the site had largely been supplanted by the modern city that grew up around it and thus the site lacked the integrity necessary to be considered. The request for World Heritage status was duly withdrawn by Japan.

Ten candidate areas were proposed with twenty-two component sites, spanning the cities of Kamakura, Yokohama, and Zushi:

See also
 World Heritage Sites in Japan

References 

 , Page 31

External links 
 UNESCO tentative list description
 Component sites and map 
 Kamakura: History and Historic Sites
 City of Samurai  - Position of each proposed World Heritage Site in Google Maps

Kamakura, Kanagawa
Tourist attractions in Kanagawa Prefecture
World Heritage Tentative List